The Military ranks of Nigeria are the military insignia used by the Nigerian Armed Forces. Nigeria shares a rank structure similar to that of the United Kingdom.

Commissioned officer ranks
The rank insignia of commissioned officers.

Other ranks
The rank insignia of non-commissioned officers and enlisted personnel.

References

External links